Roger Taylor is an English fiction and non-fiction author.  He was born in Heywood, Lancashire, and now lives in the Wirral.  He is a chartered civil and structural engineer, a pistol, rifle and shotgun shooter, aikido instructor/student, and an enthusiastic but inaccurate piano player.

He is the author of thirteen epic fantasy novels and a book on martial arts philosophy.  The first four books are collectively known as the Chronicles of Hawklan, the following seven are set in the same world following the events in the Chronicles, and the twelfth, 'The Return of the Sword', is the culmination of the series.  
They were published originally by Headline Book Publishing Ltd between 1988 and 1999.
The thirteenth book, 'The Keep', was published in January 2012 and is unrelated to the others.
All the books are currently published as ebooks by Mushroom eBooks, and are also available as paperbacks from Bladud Books.  His book 'Aikido - more than a martial art' was published by Atlantic Leisure Ltd in 1999 and is now available in a Kindle version (2011).

Bibliography 
Chronicles of Hawklan
I   The Call of the Sword (1988)
II  The Fall of Fyorlund (1989)
III The Waking of Orthlund (1989)
IV  Into Narsindal (1990)
 V  The Return of the Sword (1999)
 Dream Finder (1991)
 (Nightfall 1 ) Farnor (1992)
 (Nightfall 2)  Valderen (1993)
 Whistler (1994)
 Ibryen (1995)()
 Arash-Felloren (1996)
 Caddoran (1998)
 The Keep
 Aikido - more than a martial art
 Newman (2022)

External links
Official site
Publisher's site

People from Heywood, Greater Manchester
English fantasy writers
English engineers
English pianists
Living people
21st-century pianists
Year of birth missing (living people)